Gaetano Alibrandi (14 January 1914 – 3 July 2003) of the Roman Catholic Church was a senior papal diplomat and former Personal Secretary to Giovanni Battista Cardinal Montini (later Pope Paul VI).

Biography
Born at Castiglione di Sicilia in the Province of Catania, Sicily, Alibrandi was ordained priest on 1 November 1936, and obtained a Doctorate on Divinity from the Pontifical Lateran University and a Doctorate on Civil and Canon Law. He entered the Diplomatic Corps of the Holy See on 1941 serving for five years in the Vatican Secretariat of State and later, as Apostolic Internuncio to Indonesia (1958),

In 1961 he received episcopal consecration as titular Archbishop of Binda by Fernando Cardinal Cento upon his appointment as Nuncio of Chile (1961), followed quickly by similar appointments in Lebanon (1963), and Ireland (1969) where he retired in 1989. As Apostolic Nuncio to Chile he led the Chilean delegation to the Second Vatican Council.

Nuncio to Ireland
He was appointed Papal  Nuncio to Ireland on 19 April 1969, shortly after the outbreak of the Troubles.  This was a challenging time for the Church in Ireland then led by Cardinal William Conway as it adjusted to both the internal changes generated by the Second Vatican Council and the wider social changes.   Alibrandi was ill-suited to coping with these changes and in particular the violence in Northern Ireland. It is widely assumed that he saw to it that the more overtly nationalist Tomas Ó Fiaich was appointed to Armagh in 1977 after the death of Cardinal Conway.  The journalist and author Ed Moloney in his book on the IRA asserts that Alibrandi's "sympathy for the IRA was a constant source of friction with the government in London."

In many of the episcopal appointments made while Alibrandi was nuncio he favoured doctrinally 'sound', right of centre priests and in the case of the Archdiocese of Dublin picked two priests Kevin McNamara and Desmond Connell who were notably ill-suited. In a profile of the Archbishop at the time of his retirement T.P. O'Mahony observed in The Tablet "although he rarely gave interviews, and never overtly intervened in policy-making or in public controversies, it is beyond dispute that Archbishop Alibrandi wielded considerable influence behind the scenes."   The respected academic and church historian Dermot Keogh assessing this period argues that "there was a general view that the best candidates had not been appointed...that a number were not up to the job, that most of the appointees shared a defensive attitude to matters of church and state. 

He had “a very testy relationship with three Taoisigh – Jack Lynch, Liam Cosgrave and Garret FitzGerald”.
It was reported in September 2012 during the second Dr Garret FitzGerald Memorial Lecture at University College Cork by Seán Donlon, former secretary general at the Department of Foreign Affairs, that "It came to our [Department of Foreign Affairs] attention that a substantial amount in three bank accounts in Dublin [held by the archbishop] were way in excess of what was needed to run the nunciature. The source [of the money] appeared to be South America." Donlon went on to say "Because of its size, we thought it appropriate to ask if the funds belonged to the Holy See." When contacted for an answer, Dr Alibrandi "quickly answered ‘no’ and that they belonged to ‘family’. When it was pointed out to him that the money was then liable under Irish taxation law to DIRT, he said he would retire shortly and the accounts would be closed".

References

1914 births
2003 deaths
Participants in the Second Vatican Council
20th-century Italian Roman Catholic titular archbishops
Apostolic Nuncios to Ireland
Apostolic Nuncios to Lebanon
Apostolic Nuncios to Chile
Pontifical Ecclesiastical Academy alumni